Puddingstone Distillery is a small batch gin distillery in Wilstone, Tring, Hertfordshire, United Kingdom. The company was founded by Ben and Kate Marston in 2016 and is the first artisan gin distillery in Hertfordshire.

History
On 11 November 2016, the distillery opened its doors and the company was formally launched with its first product, Campfire London Dry Gin.

Campfire Cask Aged Gin was released in March 2017, followed by Campfire Navy Strength Gin in April. Six months after Campfire Navy Strength Gin's release Puddingstone Pudding Gin, referred to as PUD PUD, was the first seasonal gin created by the distillery, and was launched in November 2017.

A cask aged version of PUD PUD was launched in November 2018 followed by a cherry version in 2019.

In 2019 Puddingstone Distillery launched Campfire Old Tom Gin. Puddingstone teamed up with local charity the Box Moor Trust. The Box Moor Trust manages Roughdown Common, a SSSI, on which grows Hertfordshire's only known crop of naturally regenerating juniper. After harvesting the berries, Puddingstone Distillery created '1594 The Spirit of Box Moor', for the Trust's 425th Anniversary. The gin was launched on 11 October 2019 with proceeds going to the charity.

The distillery takes its name from Hertfordshire puddingstone, a conglomerate sedimentary rock that is found almost exclusively in Hertfordshire.

Gins

Regulars 

 Campfire London Dry Gin
 Campfire Cask Aged Gin
 Campfire Navy Strength Gin
 Campfire Old Tom Gin
 Domestique Gin

Seasonals and Limited Editions 
 PUD PUD Gin
 PUD PUD Cask Gin
PUD PUD Cherry Gin
 Special Edition No.1 Gin
 1594 Spirit of Box Moor Gin

Awards

Campfire London Dry Gin 
2021 The Gin Guide Awards London Dry Style Category Highly Commended

Campfire Cask-Aged Gin 
2021 The Gin Guide Awards Cask Aged Production Category Winner

Campfire Navy Strength Gin 
2021 The Gin Guide Awards Navy Strength Style Category Winner

References

External links
 Puddingstone Distillery

Distilleries in England
Companies based in Dacorum
British companies established in 2016
Food and drink companies established in 2016
2016 establishments in England